Kenneth Powell may refer to:

Sports
 Kenneth Powell (sprinter) (1940–2022), Indian sprinter
 Kenneth Powell (tennis) (1885–1915), British tennis player 
 Kenneth Powell (hurdler), British hurdler and champion at the Inter-Empire Championships

Others
 Kenneth J. W. Powell, Bishop Primus of the Free Church of England
 Kenneth R. Powell (1915–1987), U.S. Air Force officer

See also
 Ken Powell (Kendall J. Powell, born c. 1950), American businessman; chief executive officer of General Mills